Barabino is a surname. Notable people with the surname include:

Anna Maria Barabino (born 1966), Italian yacht racer 
Carlo Barabino (1768-1835), Italian architect
Giacomo Barabino (1928–2016), Italian Roman Catholic bishop
Gilda Barabino, American scientist and academic
Nicolò Barabino (1831–1891), Italian painter
Simone Barabino (c. 1585- c. 1620 or later), Italian painter